Marshall M. Milford House, also known as the Milford-Miller-Kerkhove House, is a historic home located at Attica, Fountain County, Indiana. It is a two-story brick structure that was built in three sections: a two-story east wing with simple Federal style detailing was built in 1845; a west wing with Greek Revival elements was added in about 1855; and a one-story kitchen wing added later in the 1800s.

It was listed on the National Register of Historic Places in 1989.  It is located in the Attica Main Street Historic District.

References

Houses on the National Register of Historic Places in Indiana
Federal architecture in Indiana
Greek Revival houses in Indiana
Houses completed in 1855
Houses in Fountain County, Indiana
National Register of Historic Places in Fountain County, Indiana
1855 establishments in Indiana
Historic district contributing properties in Indiana